Hubert Minnebo (born 6 February 1940) is an artist from Belgium. He is a painter and sculptor who often works with bronze and gold.

Minnebo began his career as a painter. He then gradually shifted to working with aluminium, opting for copper as his material, before eventually working with bronze, silver, and gold. He turned into a sculptor and jewellery designer. Minnebo has also provided the illustrations for several books by Frans Boenders and Winand Callewaert.

Examples of work

References

External links

Living people
1940 births
Belgian sculptors